is a Buddhist temple located in the city of Tateyama in southern Chiba Prefecture, Japan.

Location
Nago-dera is located on the middle slopes of Mount Nago at the southern tip of the Bōsō Peninsula, and is surrounded by forest. The area around the temple has important stands of sudajii Castanopsis, the tabunoki machilus species of laurel, the yabunikkei species of cinnamomum, camellia and the himeyuzuri species of daphniphyllum.

History
According to temple legend contained in the Nago-dera engi text, Nago-dera was founded by the wandering holy ascetic Gyōki around 717 AD to pray for the recovery of Empress Genshō from an illness. However, no historical documents have survived to substantiate this legend, and the history of the temple is thus uncertain. Most of the temple was destroyed by a fire in 1703, and its oldest existing structures are its  main hall (1732) and  pagoda (1761), both of which are registered as Chiba Prefectural Important Cultural Properties.

Nago-dera was used as a place of worship by successive samurai clans, starting with Minamoto no Yoritomo (1147–1199), Ashikaga Takauji (1305–1358), Satomi Yoshizane (1412–1488) and members of the Tokugawa clan.

The temple currently belongs to the Shingon Chizan Sect of Japanese Buddhism. This statue is a national Important Cultural Property.

Order in Buddhist pilgrimages
Nago-dera is the 33rd and last in the Bandō Sanjūsankasho, a pilgrimage circuit of 33 Buddhist temples in the Kantō region of eastern Japan dedicated to the Bodhisattva Kannon.

References

External links

那古寺へ御来山歓迎
那古寺（館山市）

Religious organizations established in the 8th century
Buddhist temples in Chiba Prefecture
Shingon temples
Pagodas in Japan
Tateyama, Chiba